Don Devereux (18 October, 1932 – 8 February 1995) was a Welsh international prop who played rugby union for Neath and rugby league for Huddersfield. He won three caps for the Wales rugby union team and also represented Wales at schools and youth level.

Rugby career
Devereux was born in Neath, but played for second class team Glynneath before moving to one of Wales's biggest clubs Neath. Devereux made his Wales début against the 1958 touring Australian team, and the next year played in two games in the 1958 Five Nations Championship under the captaincy of Clem Thomas. Of the three games Devereux played he was never on the losing side, with Wales winning two of the matches, and drawing one against England. In 1958, Devereux ended his rugby union international career by switching to the professional rugby league team Huddersfield.

Devereux played Left-, i.e. number 11, in Huddersfield's 10-16 defeat by Wakefield Trinity in the 1960 Yorkshire County Cup Final during the 1960–61 season at Headingley Rugby Stadium, Leeds on Saturday 29 October 1960.

Devereux returned to Wales in 1963 to take up a teaching post. He built a sound reputation as a schoolboy rugby coach, and later became coach of the Welsh Secondary Schools squad, but objections were raised regarding his past associations with rugby league and Devereux relinquished his role.

International matches played
Wales
  1958
  1958
  1958

Bibliography

References

1932 births
1995 deaths
Glynneath RFC players
Huddersfield Giants players
London Welsh RFC players
Neath RFC players
Rugby league players from Neath
Rugby union players from Neath
Rugby union props
Wales international rugby union players
Welsh rugby league players
Welsh rugby union players
Welsh schoolteachers